George Bernard "Dave" Koslo (né Koslowski, March 31, 1920 – December 1, 1975) was a professional baseball left-handed pitcher over parts of twelve seasons (1941–1942, 1946–1955) with the New York Giants, Baltimore Orioles and Milwaukee Braves.

Professional career 
On April 18, 1947, Koslo gave up Jackie Robinson's first major league home run, hit in the third inning.

Koslo was the National League ERA champion in 1949 with New York. For his career, he compiled a 92–107 record in 348 appearances, with a 3.68 ERA and 606 strikeouts.

Koslo was the winning pitcher in the opening game of the 1951 World Series and the losing pitcher of its final game.

Personal life 
Koslo served in World War II as a member of the 13th Airborne Division of the United States Army from 1943 to 1945. 

In 1952, Koslo's wife gave birth to a son. It was his second child after a daughter.

After recovering from a stroke in 1957, he worked in sales. He was born in Menasha, Wisconsin, and later died there at the age of 55.

See also
 List of Major League Baseball annual ERA leaders

References

External links

1920 births
1975 deaths
Major League Baseball pitchers
Baseball players from Wisconsin
New York Giants (NL) players
Baltimore Orioles players
Milwaukee Braves players
National League ERA champions
People from Menasha, Wisconsin
American people of Polish descent
United States Army personnel of World War II